The Atatürk Cultural Center, commonly called the AKM, is a concert hall, theatre and cultural centre running along the eastern side of Taksim Square in Beyoğlu, Istanbul. In 2021, it reopened to the public as a state-of-the-art cultural complex after a 13-year reconstruction period.

History
Two Turkish architects, Feridun Kip and Rüknettin Güney, proposed the building of the center on May 29, 1946, and work started on it before funding was halted in 1953.  In 1956, construction resumed under architect Hayati Tabanlıoğlu. The building, originally called the Istanbul Culture Palace, was completed in 13 years and opened on April 12, 1969, twenty-three years after the initial proposal.

On November 27, 1970, fire broke out during a performance of Arthur Miller's play The Crucible (Cadı Kazanı, "The Witch's Cauldron", in Turkish). Although there was no loss of life, some items brought from Topkapı Palace for the play of Sultan Murad IV (a caftan belonging to the Sultan, a painting of him, and a historic Koran) were destroyed in the fire, the source of which was never identified.

By June 2008, the Cultural Center was closed for renovations. The Board for the Protection of Cultural Property decided on 31 December 2009 that it should be renovated on the original site  and on 9 April 2012, a tender was held for the renovation contract. The re-opening was planned for 29 October 2013, Republic Day with an estimated budget of 70 million (approx. US$39 million). However, in May 2013 the project was halted. Reports suggested that the AKM was to be demolished as part of redevelopment plans for Taksim Square and Gezi Park and was to be replaced with a new opera house and a mosque.

During the Gezi Park protests, which began on 28 May 2013, many protesters climbed onto the roof of the AKM during the night. The roof was evacuated  and the police occupied the empty building and turned it into a logistics center. By February 2015, it was clear that the building, which had been empty for seven years, had been plundered; its technical installations, lighting and audio equipment as well as many other objects were sold at second hand markets or junk shops, even though the building was supposedly under police protection.

Gallery

The Old Complex

The complex was made up of the Grand Stage, a hall with a 1,317 seat capacity hosting the Turkish State Theatres and performances of the Turkish State Opera and Ballet; and the Concert Hall, with a 502 seating capacity for concerts, meetings and conferences. There was also a Chamber Theatre with 296 seats, the Aziz Nesin Stage with 190 seats and a cinema hall with 206 seats.

Until 2008, the center was home to the
Istanbul State Symphony Orchestra and Choir (İstanbul Devlet Senfoni Orkestrası ve Korosu),
Istanbul State Modern Folk Music Ensemble (İstanbul Devlet Modern Halk Müziği Topluluğu) and
Istanbul State Classical Turkish Music Choir (İstanbul Devlet Klasik Türk Müziği Korosu).

Over the summer, the AKM hosted the Istanbul Arts and Culture Festival.

The New Building
After it had been empty for ten years, demolition work ready for the construction of a new building to replace the original AKM began on 13 February 2018. The work was completed on 30 May 2018. On 10 February 2019, construction of the new complex began with a groundbreaking ceremony attended by President Recep Tayyip Erdoğan. It features a theatre, cinema and concert halls, an exhibition center, a convention hall, a library, a museum, an art gallery, cafés and restaurants. The architect was Murat Tabanlıoğlu, the son of Hayati Tabanlıoğlu, who had designed the original AKM. Construction cost 850 million (approx. US$162 million).

See also
Cemal Reşit Rey Concert Hall
Süreyya Opera House
Naum Theatre - main opera house of Istanbul in the 19th century
Zorlu Center PSM - largest performing arts theatre and concert hall in Istanbul
Kadıköy Haldun Taner Stage
List of concert halls
List of music venues

References

External links

Official site
MyMerhaba
Governmental Press and Information Office
  Istanbul European Choir website

Buildings and structures completed in 1969
1969 establishments in Turkey
Music venues in Istanbul
Concert halls in Istanbul
Opera houses in Turkey
Beyoğlu
1970 fires in Europe
Burned buildings and structures in Turkey
Demolished buildings and structures in Istanbul
Buildings and structures demolished in 2018
Demolished theatres
Cultural Center